Christopher Sharp may refer to:

 Christopher Sharp (cricketer) (born 1964), former English cricketer
 Christopher Sharp (barrister) (born 1953), British barrister and Deputy High Court Judge
 Chris Sharp (born 1973), singer

See also
 Chris Sharpe